Frank Williams (August 21, 1918 – June, 1987), nicknamed "Shorty", was an American Negro league outfielder in the 1940s.

A native of Newport, Kentucky, Williams made his Negro leagues debut in 1942 with the Homestead Grays. He went on to play for the Grays again in 1943 and 1946, and served in the US Army during World War II. Williams died in Westminster, California in 1987 at age 68.

References

External links
 and Seamheads

1918 births
1987 deaths
Date of death missing
Homestead Grays players
People from Newport, Kentucky
20th-century African-American sportspeople
Baseball outfielders